Ingrian can refer to:

Of or pertaining to the region of Ingria
The Ingrians, which can refer to:
Ingrian Finns, descendants of Finnish immigrants to Ingria in the 17th century
Izhorians, an indigenous people of Ingria
The Ingrian language (also called Izhorian; spoken by the Izhorians)
The Ingrian dialect of Finnish (spoken by Ingrian Finns)

Ingria